Celtis zenkeri is a species of flowering plant native to sub-Saharan Africa.

Description
Celtis zenkeri is a large tree, growing up to 30 to 50 meters high. It is fast-growing, growing up to 15 cm in height per year, and in Côte d’Ivoire its trunk can grow 0.5 to 1 cm in diameter per year. It flowers from February to April in Nigeria, and in March, August and September in Ghana.

Range and habitat
Celtis zenkeri ranges across western, central and eastern Africa south of the Sahara, from Guinea in the west to Ethiopia in the east, and south to Angola and Tanzania. The species' estimated extent of occurrence (EOO) is 8,542,025 km2.

It grows in deciduous and semi-deciduous forests, savanna woodlands, and rainforest.

Ecology
The tree's seeds are dispersed by birds and primates which eat the fruits.

References

zenkeri
Afrotropical realm flora